The Communist Party of Réunion (PCR) is a communist political party in the French overseas department of Réunion (in the Indian Ocean).

History
PCR was founded in 1959, as the French Communist Party (PCF) federation in Reunion became an independent party. In the same year, they decided to include demands for autonomy in their manifesto. The party said that it wanted autonomy but not independence. It has since abandoned its policy of autonomism. Paul Vergès led the party from its foundation until February 1993, when he stepped down and Élie Hoarau was elected general secretary; Vergès is currently serving as senator in the French senate.

During the late 1990s the relations between PCF and PCR became somewhat strained, regarding differences in party lines. Relations were, however, fully restored in 2005, on the occasion of PCF leader Marie-George Buffet's visit to the island; subsequently, the PCR stood on the list of the French Communist Party in the 2004 European Parliament elections, and Vergès became one of three MEPs elected from the PCF list at national level. The main party leaders are Hoarau, Huguette Bello and Pierre Vergès (the son of Paul Vergès).

The press outlet of the party is the daily newspaper Témoignages, founded by Paul Vergès' father, Dr. Raymond Vergès, in 1944. Temoignages has headquarters in Le Port, where the Communist Party usually gets most of their votes.

In 2012, Pour La Réunion was created by Huguette Bello as a splinter party.

Important members

National Secretary
Élie Hoarau

Senators
 Paul Vergès (2011–2016)
 Gélita Hoarau (wife of Élie Hoarau) (2005–2011, 2016–2017)

Deputies
 Huguette Bello (1997)

Mayors
 Huguette Bello (Saint-Paul, 2008–2014)
 Claude Hoarau (Saint-Louis)
 Roland Robert (La Possession)
 Yolande Pausé (Sainte-Suzanne)
 Éric Fruteau (Saint-André)
 Jean-Yves Langenier (Le Port)

Regional Councillors
 Paul Vergès
 Maya Cesari (stepdaughter of Paul Vergès )
 Yasmina Panshbaya
 Élie Hoarau
 Rahiba Dubois
 Catherine Gaud
 Aline Hoarau Murin
 Béatrice Leperlier
 Philippe Jean-Pierre

Departemental Councillors
 Maurice Gironcel
 Roland Ramakistin
 Yvon Virapin
 Robert Nativel
 Yvon Bello
 Éric Fruteau
 Monica Govindin
 Jean-Yves Langenier
 Roland Robert
 Pierre Vergès (son of Paul Vergès)

See also
 Marxist–Leninist Communist Organisation of Réunion

References

 Gilles Gauvin, Le parti communiste de la Réunion (1946-2000), Vingtième Siècle. Revue d'histoire, No. 68 (Oct. - Dec., 2000), pp. 73–94

External links
 Témoignages
 Paul Vergès MEP

Anti-capitalist political parties
Political parties in Réunion
Communist parties in Réunion
Political parties established in 1959
1959 establishments in Réunion
Parties represented in the European Parliament